ATFC can refer to:

Association football clubs

 Abergavenny Thursdays F.C.
 Aberystwyth Town F.C.
 Abingdon Town F.C.
 Aldershot Town F.C.
 Alfreton Town F.C.
 Almondsbury Town F.C.
 Alnwick Town F.C.
 Alresford Town F.C.
 Alsager Town F.C.
 Alton Town F.C.
 Amersham Town F.C.
 Amesbury Town F.C.
 Amlwch Town F.C.
 Ampthill Town F.C.
 Ardeer Thistle F.C.
 Arlesey Town F.C.
 Arnold Town F.C.
 Ashford Town (Middlesex) F.C.
 Ashford United F.C.
 Atherstone Town F.C.
 Athlone Town F.C.

See also 
 ATAFC (disambiguation)